Clinton M. Anderson (born May 26, 1993) is an American politician from Beloit, Wisconsin.  He is a member of the Wisconsin State Assembly, representing Wisconsin's 45th Assembly district since January 2023.  He is also currently a member of the Beloit city council.

Biography
Clinton Anderson was and raised in the city of Beloit, Wisconsin.  He graduated from the Beloit public schools in 2011, and received an associate's degree from University of Wisconsin–Whitewater at Rock County in 2016.  He continued his education at the University of Wisconsin–Whitewater and received his bachelor's degree in psychology in 2018.  Since graduating from college, he has worked as a volunteer coordinator at a shelter for survivors of domestic violence.

Political career
Anderson made his first run for elected office in 2016, when he ran for Wisconsin State Assembly in the 31st Assembly district, challenging incumbent Republican Amy Loudenbeck.  He won the Democratic primary with 62% of the vote, but was defeated by Loudenbeck in the general election.

The following Spring, Anderson was elected to the Beloit city council and was subsequently re-elected in 2019 and 2021.  He served a one-year term as president of the city council from April 2021 through April 2022.

In 2022, incumbent Wisconsin state representative Mark Spreitzer announced he would run for Wisconsin State Senate and would therefore not run for re-election in his Assembly seat.  Within days, Anderson announced his candidacy for the 45th Assembly district seat being vacated by Spreitzer.   He prevailed in the Democratic primary, defeating public school teacher Ben Dorscheid.  He went on to defeat Republican Jeff Klett in the general election, receiving 55% of the vote.

Personal life and family

Clinton's parents are both active in Beloit government.  His father is a building inspector for the city and his mother is secretary of the Beloit school board.  His brother, Spencer Anderson, serves as an elected member of the Beloit school board.

Electoral history

Wisconsin Assembly (2016)

| colspan="6" style="text-align:center;background-color: #e9e9e9;"| Democratic Primary, August 9, 2016

| colspan="6" style="text-align:center;background-color: #e9e9e9;"| General Election, November 8, 2016

Wisconsin Assembly (2022)

| colspan="6" style="text-align:center;background-color: #e9e9e9;"| Democratic Primary, August 9, 2022

| colspan="6" style="text-align:center;background-color: #e9e9e9;"| General Election, November 8, 2022

References

External links
 Campaign website
 
 Clinton Anderson at Wisconsin Vote
 

1993 births
Living people
Democratic Party members of the Wisconsin State Assembly 
People from Beloit, Wisconsin
21st-century American politicians
University of Wisconsin–Whitewater alumni